Allan Hassell (born 11 May 1958) is a former Australian rules footballer who played for the St Kilda Football Club in the Victorian Football League (VFL).

Notes

External links 
		

Living people
1958 births
Australian rules footballers from Victoria (Australia)
St Kilda Football Club players